Bnito (from Russian "Batumskoye Neftepromyshlennoye i Torgovoye Obschestvo", "Батумское нефтепромышленное и торговое общество"), or the Caspian and Black Sea Oil Company, was an oil business founded in 1883 by Alphonse Rothschild of the Rothschild banking family of France. In 1912, the company was acquired by Royal Dutch Shell.

See also

References

Oil companies of France
Black Sea energy
Caspian Sea
Energy companies established in 1883
Non-renewable resource companies established in 1883
Non-renewable resource companies disestablished in 1911
1883 establishments in France
1911 disestablishments in France
!
Shell plc